The 2001–02 2. Bundesliga was the 28th season of the 2. Bundesliga, the second tier of the German football league system. Hannover 96, Arminia Bielefeld and VfL Bochum were promoted to the Bundesliga while SpVgg Unterhaching, 1. FC Saarbrücken, FC Schweinfurt 05 and SV Babelsberg 03 were relegated to the Regionalliga.

League table
For the 2001–02 season SV Babelsberg 03, 1. FC Union Berlin, Karlsruher SC and 1. FC Schweinfurt 05 were newly promoted to the 2. Bundesliga from the Regionalliga while SpVgg Unterhaching, Eintracht Frankfurt and VfL Bochum had been relegated to the league from the Bundesliga.

Results

Top scorers
The league's top scorers:

References

External links
 Official Bundesliga site  
 2. Bundesliga @ DFB 
 kicker.de 

2. Bundesliga seasons
2
Germany